Emory Grove may refer to:

 Emory Grove, retreat center located in the Glyndon Historic District, Glyndon, Maryland
 Emory Grove Line, bus route operated by the Maryland Transit Administration
 Emory Grove Historic District, historic district on the National Register of Historic Places in Druid Hills, Georgia